Jonathan Erlich and Andy Ram were the defending champions, but lost in the semifinals this year.

Eric Butorac and Jamie Murray won the title, defeating Joshua Goodall and Ross Hutchins 4–6, 6–3, [10–5] in the final.

Seeds

  Jonathan Erlich /  Andy Ram (semifinals)
  Ashley Fisher /  Tripp Phillips (quarterfinals)
  Eric Butorac /  Jamie Murray (champions)
  Mahesh Bhupathi /  Justin Gimelstob (first round)

Draw

Draw

External links
 Draw

Doubles